Dasyphyllum excelsum is a species of flowering plant in the family Asteraceae. Known as bulli in Chile. This plant is known to occur in parts of South America, in Chile it occurs from Quillota to Cauquenes (32 to 35°S) between 190 and 800 m above sea level, a specific location of occurrence being in central Chile within the Cerro La Campana forests in association with the endangered Chilean wine palm, Jubaea chilensis.

Description 
It is an evergreen tree or  that measures up to 15 m (50 ft) tall and over 2 m (80 in) in diameter, soft, thin and brown bark, with deep vertical cracks, it is one of the few genera of asteraceae which are trees. The leaves are alternate, entire edge, elliptical shaped with acute apex which ends in a mucro. The leaves are yellowish green, 2-6 long and 1–2.5 cm wide, glabrous on both surfaces and pubescent on the margins, the petioles are 1–4 mm long.

Provided with two thorns (modified stipules), deciduous at the base of the leaves, the flowers are clustered in inflorescences (terminal Flower heads). The flowers are white and hermaphrodite, 5 stamens with the anthers attached. The fruit is a cylindrical achene about 3–3.5 mm long and 1 mm wide, pubescent, reddish pappi 5 mm long.

Etymology 
Dasyphyllum is derived from Greek hairy leaves, diacanthoides from Greek two thorns.

References 
 Encyclopedia of Chilean Flora Dasyphyllum

 C. Michael Hogan. 2008. Chilean Wine Palm: Jubaea chilensis, GlobalTwitcher.com, ed. N. Stromberg

Line notes 

excelsum
Chilean Matorral
Trees of Chile
Plants described in 1832
Taxa named by Ángel Lulio Cabrera